Sugar Rush is a 2019 Nigerian crime action comedy film written by Jadesola Osiberu and Bunmi Ajakaiye, and directed by Kayode Kasum. The film stars Adesua Etomi, Bisola Aiyeola and Bimbo Ademoye in the lead roles. The film had its theatrical release on 25 December 2019 coinciding Christmas and opened to mixed reviews from critics. Despite the mixed reviews, the film became a box office success and became the fourth highest grossing Nigerian film of all time.

Plot 
Sugar sisters accidentally discover $800,000 in the house of a corrupt man, Chief Douglas. In next couple of days, they start to spend some of the money only to meet their Waterloo when mafias come to claim the stake of the money. However, the news got to the EFCC where they issued a search warrant to the Sugar sisters, but weren't able to find any money. Unknowingly for them Andy, Sola's boyfriend had already stolen the money. Unfortunately as they were trying to get the money back from him, he lost his life in the process and the money was stolen by someone else. Gina, the head of the mafias sent her men to abduct the Sugar sisters and coerce them to stealing more money from "The White Lion", Anikulapo, a notorious man known for having most of Nigeria's asset. Who was also Gina's husband. So the Sugar sister's team up with some EFCC officials and successfully stole the money. Gina met them at the hideout and asked for her money, where she met the head of EFCC, who apparently admitted that she killed Chief Douglas because the money was meant to be hers. But Anikulapo caught up with them and demanded for his money. Things got heated up and there was a shoot out. Gina lost her life in the process. Luckily the sugar sisters and EFCC officials were able to escape with the money. Unfortunately Anikulapo caught up with them, took the money and demanded they be executed in a fire. But thankfully they were able to escape with the help of Bola and Sola sugar. It then ended in a scene where Anikulapo found out the money was incomplete and fake. Luckily the Sugar sisters and their mother left their house and traveled out of the country.

Cast 
 Bimbo Ademoye as Bola Sugar
 Bisola Aiyeola as Sola Sugar
 Adesua Etomi-Wellington as Susie Sugar
 Idowu Philips as Rhoda Sugar
 Uzor Arukwe as Knight
 Tobi Bakre as Andy
 Mawuli Gavor as Dan
 Toke Makinwa as Gina
 Lateef Adedimeji as Kpala
 Omoni Oboli as Mrs. Madueke
 Banky W as Anikulapo, aka White Lion
 Uchemba Williams as Obum
 D'Banj as himself (special appearance)

Production 
The principal photography of the film held for 14 days across different locations in Lagos.

Box office 
The film grossed ₦40 million in the opening weekend since the Christmas release and become the fifth highest grossing Nollywood film in 2019 with ₦58.76 million. The film entered the ₦100 million club in January 2020.

Reception 
Nollywood Reinvented rated the movie a 51% citing that the movie is "that new nollywood formula at its most potent: high tech gadgets plus famous celebrities plus comedy equals blockbuster". It praises the performances by Bimbo Ademoye and the directing from Kayode Kasum but concludes saying "Sugar Rush is best described as visually exciting mindless fun".

In its review, Nollywood Post says "Sugar rush was able to capture its audience’s attention from the beginning. It was a good choice to start with the torture scene. One is immediately curious to find out what had led to the event and that is laudable. Not only did it start well, but the series of comedic events in the story are also quite entertaining"

Nigerian Entertainment Today said "Sugar Rush is not perfect but as comedy movies go, it is a more holistic package than all the other big box office comedies that have been released in the last decade. It certainly nails the acting better, nails the direction better and nails the dialogues and sub-plots better. It maintains the right visual aesthetic without being unnecessarily fluffy, which can’t be said about the other big comedy movies of the last decade."

Awards and nominations

References

External links 
 
 

2019 films
2019 action comedy films
English-language Nigerian films
Films shot in Lagos
Nigerian comedy films
2010s crime comedy films
Nigerian action films
Nigerian supernatural films
2010s supernatural films
Films about kidnapping
Yoruba-language films
Films set in Lagos
Films about politicians
2019 crime action films
Films directed by Kayode Kasum
2010s English-language films
Nigerian multilingual films